The 2023 Eastern Kentucky Colonels football team will represent Eastern Kentucky University as a member of the ASUN–WAC Football Conference during the 2023 NCAA Division I FCS football season. Led by fourth-year head coach Walt Wells, the Colonels play home games at Roy Kidd Stadium in Richmond, Kentucky.

Previous season

The Colonels finished the 2022 season with 7–5 overall record, 3–2 in ASUN conference play. They earned a bid to the NCAA Division I First Round after Jacksonville State was inelgible for the postseason due to transition to FBS. They lost to Gardner–Webb 52–41.

After the 2022 season, the ASUN and the Western Athletic Conference (WAC), which had been partners in a football-only alliance in the 2021 and 2022 seasons, jointly announced that they would merge their football leagues.

Schedule

References

Eastern Kentucky
Eastern Kentucky Colonels football seasons
Eastern Kentucky Colonels football